Konstantin (Kostadin) Dejanović (1365–95) or Konstantin Dragaš was a Serbian magnate that ruled a large province in eastern Macedonia under Ottoman suzerainty, during the fall of the Serbian Empire. He succeeded his older brother Jovan Dragaš, who had been an Ottoman vassal since the Battle of Maritsa (1371) which had devastated part of the Serbian nobility. The brothers had their own government and minted coins according to the Nemanjić style. His daughter Jelena married Byzantine Emperor Manuel II Palaiologos in 1392. He fell at the Battle of Rovine (17 May 1395), serving the Ottomans against Wallachia, fighting alongside Serbian magnates Stefan Lazarević and Marko Mrnjavčević.

Konstantin's grandson, last Byzantine Emperor Constantine XI, was named after him, and even used the name Dragaš.

Life

Early

Konstantin's father was the despot and sevastokrator Dejan, who had held the Kumanovo-region under the rule of Stefan Dušan (r. 1331–1355). Konstantin's mother Teodora Nemanjić was a half-sister of Dušan. His maternal grandparents were King Stefan Dečanski (r. 1321–1331) and Queen Maria Palaiologina.

Reign

In around 1365, Dejanović's older brother Jovan Dragaš was holding Štip and Strumica. Jovan was elevated to despot by Emperor Uroš V (before 1373), as Emperor Dušan had elevated Dejan, their father. Ottoman sources report that in 1373, the Ottoman army compelled "Saruyar" (Jovan Dragaš) in the upper Struma, to recognize Ottoman vassalship. Konstantin had helped Jovan in ruling the lands, and when Jovan died in 1378/1379, Konstantin succeeded, subsequently managing to govern large portions of northeastern Macedonia and the Struma valley. 

He minted coins, as had his brother done. The Dragaš family generously donated to several monasteries on Mount Athos, including Hilandar, Pantaleimon (Rossikon) and Vatopédi.

On 10 February 1392 Dejanović's daughter Jelena married Manuel II Palaiologos. The next day, they were crowned Emperor and Empress by the patriarch.

After the battle of Maritsa, they were forced to become vassals of the Ottoman Empire, but they maintained close links with their Christian neighbors, including the Byzantine Empire. In 1395, together with his neighbor and ally, the Serbian king of Prilep Marko, Konstantin Dragaš was killed fighting for their Ottoman overlord Sultan Bayezid I against Mircea cel Bătrân of Wallachia at Rovine, near Craiova. The Ottomans named Konstantin's capital Velbužd after him, Köstendil (now Bulgarian Kyustendil).

Family
Dejanović was married twice. The name of his first wife is unknown, but she is not identical with Thamar (Tamara), the daughter of the Emperor (tsar) Ivan Alexander of Bulgaria, who had married a certain despotēs Constantine.  Konstantin married as his second wife Eudokia of Trebizond, daughter of Emperor Alexios III of Trebizond and Theodora Kantakouzene.  By his first wife, Konstantin had at least one daughter and possibly a son:
Helena Dragases (Jelena Dragaš, nun Hypomone), who married the Byzantine Emperor Manuel II Palaiologos and died on 13 May 1450. Their many children included the last two Byzantine emperors, of whom Constantine XI added the name Dragaš (in Greek, Dragasēs) to his own. Constantine XI was named after his grandfather.

Legacy

Dejanović is venerated in Serb epic poetry as Beg Kostadin (in poetry he was given a title of beg because he became an Ottoman vassal). Usually depicted as an overraly negative character, his characterisation primarily serves as a contrast to the persona of Marko Kraljević (the two are often portrayed as being blood brothers), with a purpouse of emphasising the difference between the two seemingly identical natures of their respective relations with the Ottomans, since both were latter's vassals. Their motives are, however, somewhat different. Whereas Marko is portrayed as accepting the Ottoman suzeranity for the sake and the well-being of his flock, Konstantin seeks a way to preserve his position and privileges with little to no regard to any form of higher moral code.

Notes

References

Sources

External links
 Oxford Dictionary of Byzantium, Oxford University Press, 1991.

14th-century Serbian nobility
14th-century people from the Ottoman Empire
People of the Serbian Empire
Serbian vassals of the Ottoman Empire
Serbian military personnel killed in action
14th century in Bulgaria
People of medieval Bulgaria
People from medieval Macedonia
People from Kyustendil
Dejanović noble family
14th-century births
1395 deaths